is a Japanese biographical film directed by Keiichi Hara about Japanese filmmaker, Keisuke Kinoshita.

Cast
 Ryo Kase as Keisuke Kinoshita
 Yūko Tanaka as Tama Kinoshita
 Yūsuke Santamaria as Toshizo Kinoshita
 Gaku Hamada as Keisuke's assistant
 Ren Osugi as Shiro Kido
 Aoi Miyazaki as Narrator

References

External links

2013 films
Films directed by Keiichi Hara
2010s Japanese films